Purani Chak is a small Village in Mansurchak Block in Begusarai District of Bihar State, India. It comes under Purani Chak Panchayath. It is 36 km north of district headquarters Begusarai, and 3 km from Mansurchak.

Geography
The geographical coordinates i.e. latitude and longitude of Purani Chak is 25.6398 and 85.9362 respectively.

References

Villages in Begusarai district